WRW or Wrw may refer to:

Warwick railway station, Warwickshire, England (station code WRW)
All airports in Warsaw, Poland (IATA code WRW)
9th Weather Reconnaissance Wing of the US Air Force
Mbariman-Gudhinma language (ISO 639-3 code WRW)
Wrw (saint), also called Urw, a Welsh saint